The 1994 Cleveland Thunderbolts season was their third in Cleveland, Ohio, United States, and the fourth overall for the Arena Football League franchise. They went 2–10 and failed to make the playoffs. The 1994 season was their final season.

Regular season

Schedule

Standings

z – clinched homefield advantage

y – clinched division title

x – clinched playoff spot

Roster

References

External links
1994 Cleveland Thunderbolts at ArenaFan.com

1994 Arena Football League season
1994 in sports in Ohio
Cleveland Thunderbolts seasons